Clematis zeylanica is a species of liana belonging to the family Ranunculaceae which is native to Asia. It was earlier classified as Naravelia zeylanica, but was renamed when molecular phylogenetic research revealed that the genus was nested in Clematis.

References

Flora of the Indian subcontinent
zeylanica
Plants described in 1753
Taxa named by Carl Linnaeus